Vimy is a commune in the Pas-de-Calais department in the Nord-Pas-de-Calais region of France

Vimy may also refer to:

Vimy, Alberta, hamlet in central Alberta, Canada
Vimy (electoral district), Canadian federal electoral district in Quebec created by the 2012 federal electoral boundaries redistribution
Canton of Vimy, previous canton in northern France, in the Pas-de-Calais département. It was disbanded following the French canton reorganisation which came into effect in March 2015
Vimy (horse) a French Thoroughbred racehorse 
Vimy Memorial Bridge, previously the Strandherd-Armstrong Bridge, bridge in Ottawa, Ontario, Canada
Vimy Foundation, Canadian charity focused on raising awareness of the role Canada played in World War I 
Vimy House, warehouse in western Ottawa, Canada, that used to store most of the collection of the Canadian War Museum
Vimy, the mascot of the 2017 Invictus Games

See also
Vimy Ridge (British Columbia), mountain ridge in east-central British Columbia, Canada
Battle of Vimy Ridge,  a military engagement fought primarily as part of the Battle of Arras, in the Nord-Pas-de-Calais region of France, during the First World War
Vickers Vimy, British heavy bomber aircraft of the First World War and post-First World War era
Canadian National Vimy Memorial, a memorial site in France dedicated to the memory of Canadian Expeditionary Force members killed during the First World War
Vimy Ridge Day, day to commemorate the deaths and casualties of members of the Canadian Corps during the First World War Battle of Vimy Ridge
Vimy Award, award presented by the Conference of Defence Associations Institute (CDAI) to Canadians who has made a significant and outstanding contribution to the defence and security of Canada and the preservation of its democratic values
HMS Vimy (D33), 1917 British V-class destroyer known as HMS Vancouver (1917), renamed HMS Vimy in April 1928
HMCS Vimy, Battle class naval trawlers used by the Royal Canadian Navy